Siempre Estoy Pensando en Ti (English: I'm Always Thinking of You) is a compilation album released by Mexican singer-songwriter Juan Gabriel with mariachi in 1978 and re-release on July 18, 1989. The track listing combines songs from the 1974 album: Con El Mariachi Vargas De Tecalitlán and 1977 album: Con Mariachi Vol. II.

Track listing

References

External links 
Juan Gabriel official myspace site
 Siempre Estoy Pensando En Ti on amazon.com
[] Siempre Estoy Pensando En Ti on allmusic.com

1978 albums
Juan Gabriel compilation albums
RCA Records albums
Spanish-language albums